Great Britain sent a delegation to compete at the 1972 Summer Paralympics in Heidelberg, West Germany. Teams from the nation are referred to by International Paralympic Committee (IPC) as Great Britain despite athletes from the whole of the United Kingdom, including those from Northern Ireland, being eligible. They sent seventy two competitors, forty seven male and twenty five female. The team won fifty-two medals—sixteen gold, fifteen silver and twenty-one bronze—to finish third in the medal table behind West Germany and the United States. Philip Craven, the former President of the IPC, competed in athletics, swimming and wheelchair basketball for Great Britain at these Games.

Disability classifications
Athletes at the Paralympics in 1972 were all afflicted by spinal cord injuries and required the use of a wheelchair. This is in contrast to later Paralympics that include events for participants that fit into any of five different disability categories; amputation, either congenital or sustained through injury or illness; cerebral palsy; wheelchair athletes; visual impairment, including blindness; Les autres, any physical disability that does not fall strictly under one of the other categories, for example dwarfism or multiple sclerosis. Each Paralympic sport then has its own classifications, dependent upon the specific physical demands of competition. Events are given a code, made of numbers and letters, describing the type of event and classification of the athletes competing.

Medalists

Medals by sport

Archery

Great Britain sent fifteen athletes to compete in archery at the Games; British archers won three silver medals and one bronze medal. Anderson was Britain's most successful archer winning silver in the women's St. Nicholas round tetraplegic event and teaming up with Taylor and Jane Blackburn to win silver in the mixed St. Nicholas round team tetraplegic event. Margaret Maughan, who won Britain's first ever Paralympic gold medal during the 1960 Games, finished sixth in the women's FITA round open.

Athletics

Great Britain's thirty-two athletics competitors won seven medals in athletics. Howie won two individual gold medals in women's wheelchair racing events and added a third gold in the 4×x40 m wheelchair relay. The winning relay team also included Carol Bryant who added an individual gold medal in wheelchair racing and a bronze in pentathlon. Philip Craven, who 29-years later would become President of the IPC finished 24th in both of his athletics events.

Dartchery

Great Britain entered two athletes in dartchery, Margaret Maughan and M. Cooper competed in the women's pairs event and won the gold medal.

Lawn Bowls

Five British lawn bowls players competed in Heidelberg, each won at  least one medal. T. Ure won a silver medal in the men's singles and also won silver in the men's pairs alongside Guthrie. In the women's events Barnard and F. Nowak won bronze and silver respectively in the singles; Nowak also teamed up with Gwen Buck to win the gold medal in the women's pairs.

Snooker

Three British snooker players competed at the Games, each won a medal. In the men's paraplegic event Michael Shelton won gold for the third consecutive Games. In the men's tetraplegic event Great Britain won gold and bronze through Haslam and Mcgann respectively.

Swimming

Twenty-three British athletes took part in swimming events at the Games winning ten medals, two gold, three silver and four bronze. Three medals were won by A. West in men's 25 metres class 1A events, he took gold in backstroke and silvers in breaststroke and freestyle. Philip Craven finished sixth in the men's 50 metres breaststroke class 3.

Table tennis

Britain entered eighteen table tennis players and won fifteen medals, two gold, four silver and nine bronze.

Weightlifting

Three British weightlifters competed in the 1972 Summer Paralympics winning one medal. In the men's light-heavyweight division R. Rowe won the gold medal with a lift of 175 kg, Alan Corrie finished sixth in the same event with his lift of 132.5 kg.

Wheelchair basketball

Great Britain entered teams in both the men's and women's events. The women's team lost both their group matches and failed to advance to the medal rounds. The men's team won three of their four group stage matches and advanced to the semifinals to face the United States. They lost the semifinal 36–52 and then lost the bronze medal playoff to Argentina meaning they finished in fourth place.

References 

Nations at the 1972 Summer Paralympics
1972
Summer Paralympics